John Fallon Colohan (1862–) was Ireland's first motorist.

Colohan was a son of J. Skerrett Colohan and Maria Sydney. His father was the Manager of the Hibernian Bank in Dublin, his mother a cousin of the Lamberts of Castle Ellen, Athenry. He studied medicine at Edinburgh Medical School, qualifying as a physician and surgeon in 1892. He practised in London, Long Ditton, Dublin, Athenry.

In 1901, upon the enacting of the Light Locomotives Bill he placed an order for a car, thereby laying claim to be the first ever Irish motorist and the owner of the largest and most powerful car in the country in 1901: a four-cylinder 25 h.p. Daimler of the kind most favored by royalty.

After 1922 he lived in Marlowe on Thames, where he became known as an eccentric, and indulged in alcohol to the extent that it shortened his life.

He was a relative of the songwriter Arthur Colahan.

References

 The Colahans - A Remarkable Galway Family, Diarmuid Ó Cearbhaill, Journal of the Galway Archaeological and Historical Society, volume 54, 2002, pp. 121–140.

People from County Galway
Alumni of the University of Edinburgh
Year of death missing
1862 births